In mathematics, the quadratic eigenvalue problem (QEP), is to find scalar eigenvalues , left eigenvectors  and right eigenvectors  such that

where , with matrix coefficients  and we require that , (so that we have a nonzero leading coefficient). There are  eigenvalues that may be infinite or finite, and possibly zero.  This is a special case of a nonlinear eigenproblem.  is also known as a quadratic polynomial matrix.

Spectral theory

A QEP is said to be regular if  identically.

Eigenvalues at infinity and eigenvalues at 0 may be exchanged by considering the reversed polynomial, . As there are  eigenvectors in a  dimensional space, the eigenvectors cannot be orthogonal. It is possible to have the same eigenvector attached to different eigenvalues.

Applications

Systems of differential equations 
Quadratic eigenvalue problems arise naturally in the solution of systems of second order linear differential equations without forcing:

Stability theory for linear systems can now be applied, as the behavior of a solution depends explicitly on the (quadratic) eigenvalues.

Finite element methods 

A QEP can result in part of the dynamic analysis of structures discretized by the finite element method.
Other applications include vibro-acoustics and fluid dynamics.

Methods of solution

Direct methods for solving the standard or generalized eigenvalue problems  and 
are based on transforming the problem to Schur or Generalized Schur form. However, there is no analogous form for quadratic matrix polynomials.
One approach is to transform the quadratic matrix polynomial to a linear matrix pencil, and solve a generalized 
eigenvalue problem. Once eigenvalues and eigenvectors of the linear problem have been determined, eigenvectors and eigenvalues of the quadratic can be determined.

The most common linearization is the first companion linearization 

with corresponding eigenvector 

For convenience, one often takes  the be the  identity matrix. We can then 

Another common linearization is given by

References

Linear algebra